Uncommon Women and Others is a 1978 made-for-television film (based upon the play of the same name. Wendy Wasserstein wrote both the original play as well as the teleplay for the televised production. It was shown in May, 1978 as part of the Great Performances series on PBS. It was directed by Steven Robman and included all of the original  cast from the 1977 Off-Broadway debut (with the exception of Glenn Close who was replaced by Meryl Streep).

Plot summary

Alumnae of Mount Holyoke College (Wasserstein's alma mater) meet for lunch one day in 1978 and talk about their time together in college. The play is thus a series of flashbacks to the 1972–1973 school year as eight seniors and one freshman try  to "discover themselves" in the wake of second-wave feminism.

Cast
Meryl Streep - Leilah
Swoosie Kurtz - Rita Altabel
Jill Eikenberry - Kate Quin
Ellen Parker - Muffet DiNicola
Ann McDonough - Samantha Stewart
Alma Cuervo - Holly Kaplan
Josephine Nicholas  - Mrs. Plumm
Cynthia Herman - Susie Friend
Anna Levine - Carter
Alexander Scourby - Narrator (voice)

References
Wasserstein, Wendy. The Heidi Chronicles, Uncommon Women and Others, & Isn't It Romantic. New York: Vintage, 1990.

External links 
Film Review
 

American films based on plays
1978 television films
1978 films
American television films
Films directed by Steven Robman
1970s English-language films